Mickaël Meira (born 25 January 1994) is a Portuguese professional footballer who plays as a goalkeeper for Moldovan club FC Petrocub Hîncești.

Club career
Meira was born in Ajaccio, France, to a Portuguese father, and emigrated to Portugal at the age of 9. He started playing football in the latter country with Grupo Recreativo Amigos da Paz, finishing his development at Sporting CP after signing in 2009.

On 16 December 2013, Meira made his professional debut with the latter club's B team, appearing in a 2–0 home win against S.C. Braga B in the Segunda Liga. The following 31 August he signed with AEL Limassol from Cyprus, showing resentment towards his former employer for treatment he received in a farewell message. In the following transfer window, he returned to Portugal and joined Atlético Clube de Portugal, going on to spend one and a half seasons in the second tier with the team.

Meira moved to Boavista F.C. on 2 June 2016 on a three-year contract. His first Primeira Liga appearance took place on 18 September of the same year, in a 1–2 home loss to C.D. Feirense.

After a year out of football, Meira competed in the Moldovan National Division with FC Zimbru Chișinău. Ahead of the 2019–20 campaign, he joined SCM Gloria Buzău of Romania's Liga II, but was one of several players released by manager Ilie Stan at the halfway point.

Remaining in Eastern Europe, Meira signed with Lori FC for the rest of the Armenian Premier League season on 7 February 2020. On 25 January 2021, he agreed to a two-year deal at FC Petrocub Hîncești from Amora FC.

References

External links

1994 births
Living people
French people of Portuguese descent
Sportspeople from Ajaccio
Footballers from Corsica
Portuguese footballers
Association football goalkeepers
Primeira Liga players
Liga Portugal 2 players
Campeonato de Portugal (league) players
C.D. Fátima players
Sporting CP B players
Atlético Clube de Portugal players
Boavista F.C. players
Amora F.C. players
AEL Limassol players
Moldovan Super Liga players
FC Zimbru Chișinău players
CS Petrocub Hîncești players
FC Gloria Buzău players
Armenian Premier League players
FC Lori players
Portugal youth international footballers
Portuguese expatriate footballers
Expatriate footballers in Cyprus
Expatriate footballers in Moldova
Expatriate footballers in Romania
Expatriate footballers in Armenia
Portuguese expatriate sportspeople in Cyprus
Portuguese expatriate sportspeople in Moldova
Portuguese expatriate sportspeople in Romania
Portuguese expatriate sportspeople in Armenia